Uychi is an urban-type settlement in Namangan Region, Uzbekistan. It is the administrative center of Uychi District. The town population in 1989 was 14,088 people.

References

Populated places in Namangan Region
Urban-type settlements in Uzbekistan